Antonio Rački (born 18 December 1973) is a Croatian cross-country skier. He competed at the 1994 Winter Olympics and the 1998 Winter Olympics.

References

External links
 

1973 births
Living people
Croatian male cross-country skiers
Olympic cross-country skiers of Croatia
Cross-country skiers at the 1994 Winter Olympics
Cross-country skiers at the 1998 Winter Olympics
Sportspeople from Rijeka